The 2007 season was the 95th year of competitive soccer in the United States.

National team

Men

Senior

The home team or the team that is designated as the home team is listed in the left column; the away team is in the right column.

Women

Senior

The United States Women's National Soccer Team was coached by Pia Sundhage.

Four Nations Tournament

Algarve Cup

International Friendlies

World Cup

International Friendlies

Major League Soccer

Table

 – Toronto FC cannot qualify for the CONCACAF Champions League through MLS.  Rather, they can qualify through the Canadian Championship.If they had qualified for the Champions League through MLS, then the highest placed team not already qualified would have qualified.

 – Additional Champions League berths were awarded to the winner (Houston) and runner-up (New England) of MLS Cup 2007.The winner of the 2007 U.S. Open Cup (New England) also qualified.Because New England qualified twice, an additional berth was awarded to the 2007 MLS Supporters' Shield runner-up (Chivas USA).

Playoffs

1 The Kansas City Wizards earned the eighth and final playoff berth, despite finishing fifth in the Eastern Conference.  They represent the fourth seed in the Western Conference playoff bracket, as only three teams in the Western Conference qualified for the playoffs.

MLS Cup

USL First Division

Table
Purple indicates regular season champion 
Green indicates playoff berth clinched

Playoffs

Final

USL Second Division

Table

1New Hampshire was penalized 1 point for circumstances not released by the USL.

Playoffs

Final

Lamar Hunt U.S. Open Cup

Final

American clubs in international competitions

Houston Dynamo

D.C. United

Los Angeles Galaxy

FC Dallas

References
 American competitions at RSSSF
 American national team matches at RSSSF

 
2007